The M. E. Davis House is a historic house at 200 North Knox Street in Dermott, Arkansas.  The two story wood-frame house was built in 1925, and is one of the largest houses in Dermott; it is still one of only a few two story houses there.  The Craftsman style house was built for Matthew E. Davis, an African-American businessman.  Davis was notable in the town for opening his home to impoverished African-Americans leaving the sugar cane plantations by train, and helping them find work in the local mills and acquire their own homes.

The house was listed on the National Register of Historic Places in 2004.

As a youth growing up in Dermott also living on Knox Street I use to mow this yard on the weekend for $5.00.  A good friend would let me borrow their lawnmower and it took me all morning, but I got the job done.  Five ($5), that was a lot of money for an eight or nine-year-old child in the mid 60's.

See also
National Register of Historic Places listings in Chicot County, Arkansas

References

Houses on the National Register of Historic Places in Arkansas
Houses completed in 1925
Houses in Chicot County, Arkansas
National Register of Historic Places in Chicot County, Arkansas
Dermott, Arkansas